T. Lynn Ocean is an American author of present-day Southern fiction. Ocean's first publication was in the 'North Myrtle Beach Times,' after she pleaded the editor and offered to write for free. Her first column, the 'Humor Me', was published in 1995. In 2005, St. Martin's Press released her first novel, "Fool Me Once."

Often working as a freelance writer for major newspapers and publications—including her local paper, The Sun News—Ocean has had three novels published. These are Fool Me Once, Sweet Home Carolina, and Southern Fatality. Her most recent novel, Southern Fatality, is the first instalment of a mystery series featuring the character Jersey Barnes. The next instalment is Southern Poison and will be available in Fall 2008.

She was a guest author at the 2007 South Carolina book festival held in Columbia, South Carolina, and the 2008 Virginia Festival of the Book in Charlottesville, Virginia.

Ocean is a member of the Mystery Writers Association, as well as a member of International Thriller Writers. She lives in Myrtle Beach, South Carolina, and earned her degree from Texas State University.

Ocean and her husband live in Little River, South Carolina.

Novels

References

External links
Romantic Times – Review of Sweet Home Carolina
Armchair Interviews  – Review of Sweet Home Carolina
Contemporary Romance Writers – T. Lynn Ocean

American women writers
Living people
Year of birth missing (living people)
21st-century American women